Surbani (also Romanized as Sūrbānī; also known as Sūrbān and Sūrehbān) is a village in Targavar Rural District, Silvaneh District, Urmia County, West Azerbaijan Province, Iran. At the 2006 census, its population was 45, in 6 families.

References 

Populated places in Urmia County